Charles Chapman may refer to:

Entertainment
 Charles Chapman (guitarist) (1950/1951–2011), American guitarist
 Charles Shepard Chapman (1879–1962), American painter
 C. H. Chapman (Charles Henry Chapman, 1879–1972), British illustrator and cartoonist
 C.C. Chapman (Charles Chapman), podcaster

Sports
 Charles Chapman (cricketer, born 1806) (1806–1892), English cricketer
 Charles Chapman (cricketer, born 1860) (1860–1901), English cricketer
 Charles Frederic Chapman (1881–1976), boater, author, editor of Motor Boating magazine
 Chuck Chapman (Charles Chapman, 1911–2002), Canadian basketball player
 Charles Chapman (swimmer), first black swimmer to swim across the English Channel, 1981
 Charlie Chapman (Australian footballer) (1905–1978), Australian rules footballer
 Charlie Chapman (rugby union) (born 1998), English rugby union player

Military
 Charles Chapman (British Army officer) (died 1795), Commander-in-Chief, India
 Charles Chapman (RFC officer) (1887–1917), British World War I flying ace
 Charles Chapman (MP) (1752–1809), English East India officer and Member of Parliament for Newton, Isle of Wight

Politics
 Charles Chapman (Connecticut politician) (1799–1869), U.S. Representative from Connecticut
 Charles R. Chapman (1827–1897), mayor of Hartford, Connecticut
 Charles Chapman (mayor) (1853–1944), mayor of Fullerton, California
 Charles Chapman (New Zealand politician) (1876–1957), politician of the Labour Party

Other
 Charles Chapman (engineer) (1897–1979), invented the high speed diesel engine (for automobiles)
 Charles 'Pop' Chapman (1874–1955), Australian gold prospector, businessman, and newspaper publisher
 Charles Henry Chapman (Alpha Phi Alpha co-founder) (1870–1934), American academic

See also
Charles Chapman Grafton (1830–1912), bishop of the Diocese of Fond du Lac